Ahmed Proverbs (born 28 January 1970) is a Barbadian cricketer. He played in five first-class and six List A matches for the Barbados cricket team from 1990 to 1997, and a single Twenty20 match in 2008.

See also
 List of Barbadian representative cricketers

References

External links
 

1970 births
Living people
Barbadian cricketers
Barbados cricketers